The China Study Group (CSG) of the Government of India is an informal official group set up for advising the government on its China policy. It is a confidential body made up of inter-ministerial secretary-level officials. Set up by the Cabinet Committee on Political Affairs under the Indira Gandhi government in November 1975, it was first headed by diplomat K.R. Narayanan (later President of India).  It has been under the charge of civil servants such as Brajesh Mishra and Ajit Doval.

History 
Shivshankar Menon wrote in his book "Choices":

China Study Group has a key structural role in the ongoing 2020 China–India skirmishes. 

Patrolling Points (PPs) for Indian troops along the China–India border were defined by the China Study Group in the 1970s.

Members 
In 2020, the CSG was headed by National Security Advisor Ajit Doval. CSG members include:

 Cabinet Secretary
 Foreign Secretary
 Home Secretary
 Defence Secretary
 Vice Chief of the Army Staff
 Vice Chief of the Naval Staff
 Vice Chief of the Air Staff
 Director of the Intelligence Bureau
 Director of R&AW

Notes

References 

China–India relations
1975 establishments in India
Government agencies of India